Sgt. Jack William Avery (5 November 1911 – 6 July 1940) was a British War Reserve Constable who was murdered in Hyde Park, London, having served less than one year with the Metropolitan Police Service.

On 5 July, Sgt. Avery was advised by a member of the public that Frank Stephen Cobbett was acting suspiciously. Avery approached Cobbett, who was lying on the grass and writing on a piece of paper, and took the paper from him. Avery returned the paper to Cobbett, who stabbed the officer in the groin or upper thigh with a carving knife. Avery died the next day. Cobbett, a 42-year-old homeless labourer, was originally sentenced to death by Mr. Justice Atkinson, even though the jury strongly recommended mercy because of his "low mentality." After an appeal, Cobbett served 15 years' penal servitude for manslaughter instead.

In 2007, Ian Blair, then Metropolitan Police Commissioner, unveiled a memorial to Avery in Hyde Park, close to the place where he was attacked.

See also
List of British police officers killed in the line of duty

References

Deaths by person in London
Deaths by stabbing in London
Crime in the City of Westminster
1940 murders in the United Kingdom
1940 in London
Murder in London
July 1940 events
1940s in the City of Westminster
1940s murders in London
1911 births
1940 deaths